Entre Ríos is an Argentine indietronica band originally formed in Buenos Aires by Sebastián Carreras, Gabriel Lucena and Isol (Marisol Misenta) in 2000. They became popular when the song "Hoy no" was used in a Quilmes spot.

In 2005 Isol left the group the release of their album Onda. She was replaced by Paula Meijide, who was part of the band until 2006. In 2008, Rosario Ortega and Romina Dangelo joined Entre Ríos as the vocalist and drummer respectively.

They have performed many gigs around Spain and Latin America, and were a big influence for other groups such as Miranda! and Belanova.

Discography
Litoral, EP, 2000
Temporal, EP, 2001
Provincia, 2001
Idioma suave (trans. "Gentle Language"), 2002
Sal (trans. both "Salt" and "Come Out"), 2003
Completo, 2005
Onda (trans. "Wave"), 2005
Entre Ríos (trans. "Between Rivers"), 2008

External links
Entre Ríos in Myspace
Official Microsite at Índice Virgen
[ Entre Ríos in AllMusic.com]
Entre Ríos in CDDB
Yahoo Group unofficial
Isol
Paula Meijide
Entre Ríos Si Hoy video

Argentine musical groups
Synthpop groups